Liberty Township is one of the seventeen townships of Hancock County, Ohio, United States. As of the 2010 census, the population was 6,660.

Geography
Located in the central part of the county, it borders the following municipalities:
Portage Township - north
Allen Township - northeast
City of Findlay - east (county seat)
Jackson Township - southeast corner
Eagle Township - south
Union Township - southwest corner
Blanchard Township - west
Pleasant Township - northwest corner

Name and history
It is one of twenty-five Liberty Townships statewide.

Parks
Liberty township has two Hancock Park District parks, Litzenberg Memorial Woods and Oakwoods Nature Preserve. In addition, it has the Liberty Landing canoe access to the Blanchard River.  The 20-mile Heritage Trail runs through Liberty township.

Government
The township is governed by a three-member board of trustees, who are elected in November of odd-numbered years to a four-year term beginning on the following January 1. Two are elected in the year after the presidential election and one is elected in the year before it. There is also an elected township fiscal officer, who serves a four-year term beginning on April 1 of the year after the election, which is held in November of the year before the presidential election. Vacancies in the fiscal officership or on the board of trustees are filled by the remaining trustees.

References

External links
Liberty Township official website

Townships in Hancock County, Ohio
Townships in Ohio